Dismantling Devotion is the second full-length album by Daylight Dies released by Candlelight Records in 2006.

Track listing

Credits
Nathan Ellis – harsh vocals
Barre Gambling – guitars
Charley Shackelford – guitars
Egan O'Rourke – bass, clean vocals
Jesse Haff – drums

Session musicians

Matthew Golombisky – contrabass

Daylight Dies albums
2006 albums